Claudia Sulewski (born February 19, 1996) is an American YouTuber, host and actress. In 2009, she started making videos on her YouTube channel in her hometown of Chicago, before moving to Los Angeles in 2014, where she jumped into hosting. A year later, she began hosting videos for Teen Vogues YouTube channel, becoming its regular host. She has continued on to an acting career, debuting in the 2022 film I Love My Dad.

Early life 
Sulewski was born in Chicago, Illinois, to Polish parents Beata Krupińska  and Czesław Sulewski. She was raised in Park Ridge, a suburb of Chicago. She grew up Catholic and went to Polish school every Saturday up until 8th grade, which included religion class. She has two brothers, Marcin and Kevin.

Career

YouTube and hosting
She started her YouTube channel in 2010 with the name BeyondBeautyStar, and used the same name on Instagram. Her channel consists of videos about her fashion choices, beauty routines, travels, interior design endeavors, workouts, daily life, and wellness; she has since changed her channel's display name to her full name, 'Claudia Sulewski', as well as all her accounts across social media.

During the COVID-19 pandemic lockdowns, Sulewski and her boyfriend, musician Finneas O'Connell, started the podcast We Bought A House. Soon after, they stopped doing the podcast, O'Connell citing that they felt like they were "sharing too much."

Fashion
She has also ventured into fashion by collaborating with Nordstrom BP to create a clothing line for which she acted as the social media creative director, crafting the advertisements and producing her own lookbook for the launch.

Acting and directing

From 2016 to 2017, she appeared in the TV series The Commute, and from 2016 to 2018, in the webseries T@gged. In 2019, she appeared in an episode of Marvel's Runaways.

She will be making her wide-release feature film debut in the 2022 movie I Love My Dad, co-starring James Morosini, who also writes and directs, and Patton Oswalt. The film premiered at South by Southwest on March 12, winning the Jury and Audience Awards in the Narrative Film Competition. Sulewski also directed, filmed, and edited the music video of O'Connell's song, "Mona Lisa, Mona Lisa", released in July. The music video was filmed on iPhone and a handycam in Paris, France.

Personal life 

Since 2018, Sulewski has been in a relationship with musician Finneas O'Connell. She has since became an inspiration for O'Connell's music, such as in songs "Claudia" and "Mona Lisa, Mona Lisa", the prior in which she painted the cover art, and the latter in which she directed the music video.

In a YouTube Q&A, Sulewski touched on her reasoning on why she omits her boyfriend's sister, singer Billie Eilish, from her videos, saying that Eilish "is very famous, obviously, to the point that anything about her gets reposted everywhere, and I don't want that kind of attention, because I don't want people to think that that's what they get when they come on my channel," adding that not everything that happens is recorded and put online. Off-camera, she is regularly seen around O'Connell's family, including Eilish.

Filmography

Television and webseries

Film

Music video

References

External links 

1996 births
21st-century American actresses
American web series actresses
American YouTubers
YouTube vloggers
American TikTokers
Living people
People from Chicago
American people of Polish descent